The 2020 Nevada Wolf Pack football team represented the University of Nevada, Reno in the 2020 NCAA Division I FBS football season. The Wolf Pack were led by fourth–year head coach Jay Norvell and played their home games at Mackay Stadium. They were members of the Mountain West Conference.

On August 10, 2020, the Mountain West Conference suspended all sports competitions due to the COVID-19 pandemic. On September 24, the conference announced that the football season would begin on October 24.

Preseason

Award watch lists

Mountain West media days
The Mountain West media days were originally scheduled on July 16–17, 2020, at SoFi Stadium in Inglewood, California, but were canceled in favor of virtual media days due to the COVID-19 pandemic. The virtual media days that were scheduled to take place on July 27–29, 2020, were also canceled.

Media poll
The preseason poll was released on July 21, 2020. The Wolf Pack were predicted to finish in second place in the MW West Division. The divisions were later suspended for the 2020 season.

Preseason All−Mountain West Team
The Wolf Pack had two players selected to the preseason All−Mountain West Team; one from the offense and one from the defense.

Offense

Brandon Talton – PK

Defense

Dom Peterson – DL

Schedule

Original

Revised

Rankings

Personnel

Depth chart

Game summaries

Wyoming

at UNLV

Utah State

at New Mexico

San Diego State

at Hawaii

Fresno State

vs. San Jose State

vs. Tulane (Famous Idaho Potato Bowl)

Notes

References

Nevada
Nevada Wolf Pack football seasons
Famous Idaho Potato Bowl champion seasons
Nevada Wolf Pack football